Tomasz Leżański (born 14 May 1947) is a Polish archer. He competed in the men's individual event at the 1972 Summer Olympics.

References

1947 births
Living people
Polish male archers
Olympic archers of Poland
Archers at the 1972 Summer Olympics
Sportspeople from Warsaw